Alderman John Ashley Kilvert  (1833–1920) was an English soldier and later businessman and politician, who became Mayor of Wednesbury, then in Staffordshire, England. He served as a cavalryman with the 11th Hussars in the Crimean War, where he survived the Charge of the Light Brigade. His medals are displayed at Wednesbury Museum and Art Gallery.

Early life 

Kilvert was born on 29 September 1833, at High Ercall, Shropshire, the son of George Kilvert, a farmer. He was educated at High Ercall Grammar School. His early career was in the wine trade.

Military service 

Kilvert enlisted in the 11th Hussars, part of the British army, in Nottingham. He attained the rank of corporal on 9 July 1854.

Serving in the British army during the Crimean War, Kilvert took part in the Charge of the Light Brigade, on 25 October 1854. He was hit by a musket ball which passed through his right leg, and then into his horse. He then suffered a minor sabre wound to the head. His horse carried him to safety, but had to be euthanised. Kilvert's return is depicted in the painting on the dust jacket of the book Honour the Light Brigade. The next day he was promoted to sergeant. After some delay, during which he was left in a ditch and later found there half frozen, he was taken to Florence Nightingale's Scutari Hospital, and then to Malta, before being returned to England in February 1855.

He later recalled:

He subsequently worked as an army recruiter based in Bath. He ended his military career with the rank of Troop Sergeant-Major, which he attained in 1857.

He was awarded the British Crimea Medal with bars for Alma, Balaklava and Sebastopol, presented to him by Queen Victoria in a ceremony on Horseguards Parade on 18 May 1855. He also received the Turkish Crimean War Medal (Sardinian variant).

Civic service 

After the war, Kilvert lived in Coventry, married there, and had a son named George. On the death of his wife, he moved to Wednesbury, and remarried. He operated a pawnbrokers from premises in Union Street where he also lived. His second wife died in 1900, as did his son in 1902. He sold the pawnbroking business and moved to a house at 13 Pritchard Street, which he named 'Balaclava House', after the battle.

He was elected to the town council in 1886, becoming an Alderman and later, in 1905, a year before he stood down from public service, Mayor. As he was a widower, he selected his niece, Mrs. Harris, to act as his Mayoress. He also served as a magistrate (JP).

Legacy 

Kilvert died in Wednesbury on 17 October 1920 and was buried in plot A1037 at Wood Green Cemetery there on 22 October. He was the last but two of the British Charge of the Light Brigade participants to die. His gravestone does not mention his role in the charge.

He bequeathed his medals, and the sword he used during the charge, to Wednesbury Museum. The medals were noted as missing in 1974, believed stolen. After passing through several hands they were bought, innocently, by Walter Hands, a medal collector from Walsall. After his death, Mrs Hands put them up for auction in 2013, when their origin was identified and she agreed to donate them back to the museum.

A portrait of Kilvert, in oil, in which he is shown wearing civic regalia, is also at Wednesbury Museum and Art Gallery. The artist is unknown.

The sword Kilvert used at the Charge of the Light Brigade is in the possession of Sandwell College where one of the floors at Central Campus is named after him.

References 

1833 births
1920 deaths
People from Coventry
People from Wednesbury
British Army personnel of the Crimean War
Military personnel from Shropshire
11th Hussars soldiers
Mayors of places in the West Midlands (county)
Mayors of places in Staffordshire